Geoff Collinson is an Australian  horn player and was the head of the brass department at the University of Melbourne. He was the principal horn with the Australian Opera and Ballet Orchestra from 1990 until 2000; he was also guest principal horn of the Sydney Symphony Orchestra, Queensland Symphony Orchestra, and the Australian Chamber Orchestra. He is the founder and one of the directors of the  Melbourne International Festival of Brass.

References

External links
Geoff Collinson – French Horn, profile at Zelman Symphony
Geoff Collinson – Head of Brass, Melbourne University

Living people
Year of birth missing (living people)
Australian classical horn players
Australian music educators
Academic staff of the University of Melbourne